The square root of 5 is the positive real number that, when multiplied by itself, gives the prime number 5. It is more precisely called the principal square root of 5, to distinguish it from the negative number with the same property. This number appears in the fractional expression for the golden ratio. It can be denoted in surd form as:

It is an irrational algebraic number. The first sixty significant digits of its decimal expansion are:

 .

which can be rounded down to 2.236 to within 99.99% accuracy. The approximation  (≈ 2.23611) for the square root of five can be used. As of January 2022, its numerical value in decimal has been computed to at least 2,250,000,000,000 digits.

Rational approximations
The square root of 5 can be expressed as the continued fraction

  

The successive partial evaluations of the continued fraction, which are called its convergents, approach :

Their numerators are 2, 9, 38, 161, … ,  and their denominators are 1, 4, 17, 72, … .

The Babylonian method is equivalent to Newton's method for root finding applied to the polynomial .  The Newton's method update, is equal to  when .  The method therefore converges quadratically.

Relation to the golden ratio and Fibonacci numbers

 
(See the section below for their geometrical interpretation as decompositions of a  rectangle.)

 then naturally figures in the closed form expression for the Fibonacci numbers, a formula which is usually written in terms of the golden ratio:

 

 

The series of convergents to these values feature the series of Fibonacci numbers and the series of Lucas numbers as numerators and denominators, and vice versa, respectively:

 

In fact, the limit of the quotient of the  Lucas number  and the  Fibonacci number  is directly equal to the square root of :

Geometry

Geometrically,  corresponds to the diagonal of a rectangle whose sides are of length 1 and 2, as is evident from the Pythagorean theorem. Such a rectangle can be obtained by halving a square, or by placing two equal squares side by side. This can be used to subdivide a square grid into a tilted square grid with five times as many squares, forming the basis for a subdivision surface.

By contrast, the shortest distance when traversing through the inside of the cube corresponds to the length of the cube diagonal, which is the square root of three times the edge.

A root-5 rectangle is particularly notable in that it can be split into a square and two equal golden rectangles (of dimensions ), or into two golden rectangles of different sizes (of dimensions  and ). It can also be decomposed as the union of two equal golden rectangles (of dimensions ) whose intersection forms a square. The root-5 rectangle can be constructed from a 1:2 rectangle (the root-4 rectangle), or directly from a square in a manner similar to the one for the golden rectangle shown in the illustration, but extending the arc of length  to both sides.

Trigonometry
The simplest of these are

As such the computation of its value is important for generating trigonometric tables. Since  is geometrically linked to half-square rectangles and to pentagons, it also appears frequently in formulae for the geometric properties of figures derived from them, such as in the formula for the volume of a dodecahedron.

Diophantine approximations
Hurwitz's theorem in Diophantine approximations states that every irrational number  can be approximated by infinitely many rational numbers  in lowest terms in such a way that

In particular, one cannot obtain a tighter bound by considering sequences of four or more consecutive convergents.

Algebra
This ring is a frequently cited example of an integral domain that is not a unique factorization domain. The number 6 has two inequivalent factorizations within this ring:
 
The field  like any other quadratic field, is an abelian extension of the rational numbers. The Kronecker–Weber theorem therefore guarantees that the square root of five can be written as a rational linear combination of roots of unity:

Identities of Ramanujan
The square root of 5 appears in various identities discovered by Srinivasa Ramanujan involving continued fractions.

For example, this case of the Rogers–Ramanujan continued fraction:

See also

 Golden ratio
 Square root
 Square root of 2
 Square root of 3
 Square root of 6
 Square root of 7

References

Mathematical constants
Quadratic irrational numbers